Red Bull Illume is an international photography contest for adventure and action sports photography. It showcases creative and captivating photography and aims to bring the public closer to the world of adventure and action sports. Every year, Red Bull Illume has several partners on its side, who foster the Red Bull Illume Image Quest.
In 2021, its sixth edition, Red Bull Illume added the new category Photo Story. 41,447 images were submitted by thousands of photographers with entries from all around the world.
A judging panel of 53 photo editors and digital experts selected 56 Finalists, 11 Category Winners and 1 Overall Winner, which were unveiled for the first time ever on Instagram Live and the Red Bull Illume Website. The Overall Winner was Will Saunders. The next Red Bull Illume Image Quest will take place in 2023.

Quotes on Red Bull Illume
Adventure and action sports photography is the most demanding of all, specifically in terms of the physical and creative challenges. After 15 years of jaw-dropping images, it's absolutely astonishing to see the amount of new ideas brought to life every two years, even more so from emerging photographers.
The essence of Red Bull Illume is to illuminate the world's very best adventure and action sports images and its unsung heroes - the people behind the cameras.
–  Ulrich Grill, Founder of Red Bull Illume (2021)

This is the most incredible collection I have ever seen assembled in one place and it is one of the most phenomenal experiences I have had in my 17 years of photo editing.
–  Anne Telford, Photo Editor of Communication

I think we all felt, finally, that our work was recognized as an art form thanks to the way Red Bull Illume showcased our images.
– Brian Bielmann, Photographer

Commitment, passion and daring are qualities necessary to persevere in action and adventure sports—they are also the required elements to effectively capture the action on film. The Red Bull Illume Image Quest spotlights the individual behind the camera, praising the triumphs achieved in action and adventure sports photography.
- Rangefinder Magazine (20.12.2006)

Red Bull Illume Image Quest 2021
The Red Bull Illume Image Quest 2021 was the sixth edition bringing together the amazing work of photographers and content creators from around the world. Submissions for the global contest were entered on the website and on Instagram. The category Photo Story was the newest addition, a category for photos presented in a slideshow from 30 seconds up to 3 minutes. Into the category Best of Instagram, both photos and moving images could be submitted. A judging panel of 53 renowned photo editors and industry experts reviewed a total of 41,447 submissions, narrowing down the selection in five voting rounds to reach 256 semi-finalists, 56 finalists, 11 category winners, and ultimately, the overall winner of the Red Bull Illume Image Quest 2021.

The category winners were announced during the Unveiling Week from November 29 until December 4, 2021, on Instagram Live and on redbullillume.com. During this week, one category winner was announced online every day. The winner also received a trophy, which was already placed in front of their front-door in order to get the full winner experience. Through the online unveiling not only photographers, but also Red Bull Illume fans all over the world could experience these emotional moments. Will Saunders was crowned the overall winner for his shot of a falling climber in Utah, USA. He was handed his trophy by former Red Bull Illume Overall Winner Chris Burkard in Aspen Snowmass, CO, USA. After the unveiling all finalist images will be displayed on 2x2m lightboxes and exhibited around the world, giving photographers an unprecedented level of exposure.

Official partners for the 2021 Image Quest include global computing leader Lenovo, premium storage specialist SanDisk Professional, creator of mountain sports equipment Black Diamond, German camera manufacturer Leica, WhiteWall, the best photo lab for everyone who loves photography, and COOPH, producer of photography apparel and accessories.

Category Winners 2021 
The winning photos can be viewed on the website.
 Best of Instagram by Lenovo – Photo: Yhabril (ESP)
 Best of Instagram by Lenovo – Moving Image: Bruno Diego Cavalcante (BRA)
 Creative by Skylum: Jan Kasl (CZE)
 Emerging by Black Diamond: Victoria Kohner-Flanagan (USA)
 Energy by Red Bull Photography: Rod Hill (NZL)
 Innovation by EyeEm: Thomas Monsorno (ITA)
 Lifestyle by COOPH: Carolin Unrath (GER)
 Masterpiece by SanDisk Professional: Will Saunders (USA)
 Photo Story: Philipp Klein Herrero (ESP)
 Playground by WhiteWall: Markus Berger (AUT)
 RAW by Leica: Bruno Long (CAN)

Overall Winner 2021 
 Will Saunders, USA

Red Bull Illume Image Quest 2019
The Image Quest 2019 was the fifth edition and has evolved with two exciting new categories; Best of Instagram by SanDisk and the Moving Image category. The Best of Instagram by SanDisk submissions closed on June 14, 2019, and the five monthly winners have already been announced; while entries for the Moving Image category and the other nine categories of the main contest were open until July 31, 2019. Photographers could all submit their best images on redbullillume.com.

In 2019, a record-breaking 59,551 images were submitted by thousands of photographers with entries from all around the world. A judging panel of 50 photo editors and digital experts have selected the 60 Finalists, 11 Category Winners and 1 Overall Winner, which were unveiled at the Winner Award Ceremony at the LUMEN - Museum of Mountain Photography, Plan de Corones, Italy on November 20, 2019. After the unveiling, all finalist images travel to capitals and cultural hubs on three continents in parallel on the Red Bull Illume Exhibit Tour – an unprecedented level of exposure. Presented on 2x2m T-shaped lightboxes provided by CCS digital_fabric.

Official partners for the 2019 Image Quest included Japanese consumer electronics giant Sony, storage specialists SanDisk, award-winning photo software company Skylum, makers of Luminar 4 photo editing suite and COOPH, photography apparel and accessories. Along with the global partners, Salewa, the daring mountain sports equipment manufacturer, Petzl, producer of innovative headlamps for outdoor enthusiasts and SUNNYBAG, manufacturer of environmentally friendly solar panels for charging on the go, also joined as partners for the Winner Award Ceremony 2019.

Category Winners 2019 
The winning photos can be viewed on the website.
 Best of Instagram by SanDisk: Baptiste Fauchille, France
 Creative by Skylum: Denis Klero, Russia
 Emerging by Red Bull Photography: JB Liautard, France
 Energy: Ben Thouard, French Polynesia
 Innovation by Sony: Laurence Crossman-Emms, United Kingdom
 Lifestyle: Alexander Wick, Germany
 Masterpiece by EyeEm: Lorenz Holder, Germany
 Moving Image: Rupert Walker, Canada
 Playground: Lorenz Holder, Germany
 RAW: Noah Wetzel, USA
 Wings: Philip Platzer, Austria
 Best Mountain Sports Image by Salewa: Kamil Sustiak, Australia
 SanDisk Extreme Award: Philip Platzer, Austria

Overall Winner 2019 
 Ben Thouard, French Polynesia

Red Bull Illume Image Quest 2016
The 2016 Red Bull Illume Image Quest was the fourth edition of the contest after 2007, 2010 and 2013. New for 2016 was the mobile category. A judging panel of 53 photo editors went through thousands of entries and eventually selected 11 Category Winners and one Overall Winner, who were unveiled at the Red Bull Illume Winner Award Ceremony on September 28th, 2016 in Chicago, USA. Lorenz Holder (GER) took home the Overall Winner, making this the second time he has won Red Bull Illume Image Quest, as well as winning the Athlete's Choice Award, which was voted on by several of the biggest athletes in their respective sports. Following the Winner Award Ceremony in Chicago, all 55 finalist images will travel across the world as part of a unique nighttime photo exhibition. 

Submissions were open from December 1, 2015 and closed on April 1, 2016. Over 5,000 photographers originating from 120 different countries submitted 34,624 photos in the following categories:

 lifestyle
 playground
 energy
 spirit
 close up
 wings
 sequence by Sony
 new creativity
 enhance (previously known as experimental)
 masterpiece by Yodobashi (previously known as Illumination)
 mobile

Category Winners 2016 
The winning photos can be viewed on the website.
 close-up: Denis Klero - Russia
 energy: Luke Shadbolt - Australia
 spirit: Dean Treml - New Zealand
 playground: Lorenz Holder - Germany
 lifestyle: Jody MacDonald - Canada
 sequence by Sony: Daniel Vojtech - Czech Republic
 new creativity: Ale di Lullo - Italy
 enhance: Dean Treml - New Zealand
 Masterpiece by Yodobashi: Lorenz Holder - Germany
 mobile: Vegard Aasen - Norway
 wings: Micky Wiswedel - South Africa

Exhibition
The 55 finalist images are traveling across the world as part of a unique Lightbox Exhibition. The images are displayed on public squares in different cities across the globe. The first Tour Stop was held in Chicago. After that, Union Station's Sir John A MacDonald Plaza in Toronto was hosting the exhibit. There are further Tour Stops planned in the famous Hangar 7 in Salzburg, Austria and Azerbaijan. More Tour Stops will be announced.

 2016 Tour Stop: Chicago, USA. 28 Sep - 09 Oct
 2017 Tour Stop: Toronto, Canada. 31 Mar - 09 Apr
 2017 Tour Stop: Salzburg, Austria. 06 Sep - 08 Oct

Official partners for 2016 include online retailer Yodobashi, consumer electronics giant Sony, external storage brand G-Technology, photo bag manufacturer tamrac, lighting experts broncolor and Memento Smart FrameTM.

Red Bull Illume Image Quest 2013
The submission phase of the third edition of Red Bull Illume was open from December 1, 2012 until April 30, 2013. The 50 finalists were unveiled on August 29, 2013 at a ceremony at the Avenue of Stars in Hong Kong. The overall winner was Lorenz Holder (GER) whose image of snowboarder Xaver Hoffmann performing a jump at a satellite dish in Raisting, Germany was selected by an international panel of 50 photo experts, winning him a Leica S camera, a broncolor Move Outdoor kit as well as Sun-Sniper gear worth over €2,000. 

Following the Winner's Award Ceremony in Hong Kong, during which the Top 50 finalists were unveiled, the images of the 50 finalists traveled the world as an exhibition tour during 2013/2014. The exhibited images were illuminated on 2x2m light-boxes; to showcase this, the exhibition was strictly open after the sun had set. The exhibition toured the cities of Hong Kong, Scottsdale, Vancouver, Atlanta, Cologne, Copenhagen, Göteborg and Salzburg.

The 2013 Red Bull Illume Image Quest was the 3rd edition of the competition. Submissions were open from December 1 2012 until April 30, 2013.   

Photographers could submit images to the following categories:  

 lifestyle by Leica
 playground
 energy
 spirit
 close up
 wings
 sequence
 new creativity
 experimental
 illumination

Category Winners 2013
The winning photos can be viewed on the website.
 close-up: Jeroen Nieuwhuis (NED)
 energy: Romina Amato (SUI)
 experimental: Lorenz Holder (GER)
 illumination: Scott Serfas (CAN)
 lifestyle by Leica: Morgan Maassen (USA)
 new creativity: Daniel Vojtěch (CZE)
 playground: Lorenz Holder (GER)
 sequence: Zakary Noyle (USA)
 spirit: Chris Burkard (USA)
 wings: Samo Vidic (SLO)

Red Bull Illume Image Quest 2010
The submission phase of the second edition of Red Bull Illume opened on October 1, 2009, until February 28, 2010. The 50 finalists were unveiled on August 31, 2010, at a ceremony in Trinity College Dublin, Ireland. The overall winner was Chris Burkard (USA) whose image of surfer Peter Mendia off Chile's west coast was selected by an international panel of 53 photo experts, winning him a Leica S2 camera worth €30,000. The exhibition then toured the cities of Houston, Charleston, Miami, Denver, Salzburg and Bern. 

Photographers could submit images to the following categories:
 culture
 playground
 energy
 spirit
 close up
 wings
 sequence
 new creativity
 experimental
 illumination

Category Winners 2010
The winning photos can be viewed on the website.
 close-up: Nathan Smith (AUS)
 energy: Stuart Gibson (AUS)
 experimental: Daniel Grund (GER)
 illumination: Chris Burkard (USA)
 culture: Vincent Perraud (FRA)
 new creativity: Eric Berger (CAN)
 playground: Tim Korbmacher (GER)
 sequence: Miguel Lopez Virgen (MEX)
 spirit: Adam Kokot (POL)
 wings: Marcel Lämmerhirt (AUT)

Red Bull Illume Image Quest 2007
The first edition of the Image Quest In 2007 resulted in 2,000 established and amateur photographers from over 90 different countries submitting more than 7,500 images. They were judged by a panel of expert photo editors such as Kari Stein of Sports Illustrated, Paul Sanders of The Times and Nick Hamilton of Transworld Snowboarding.
The subsequent exhibition tour showcased the 50 finalist images in exceptional outdoor venues across North America, e.g. on the slopes of Aspen or Huntington Beach Pier.

Category Winners 2007
The winning photos can be viewed on the website.
 close-up: Dawn Kish (USA)
 energy: Thomas Stöckli (SUI)
 experimental: Tim McKenna (AUS)
 illumination: Gian Paul Lozza (SUI)
 lifestyle: Desré Pickers (RSA)
 new creativity: Jimmy Wilson (USA)
 playground: Wojtek Antonow (POL)
 sequence: David Blažek (CZE)
 spirit: Brian Bielmann (USA)
 wings: Fred Mortagne (FRA)

In video games
In PlayStation Home, Red Bull released a virtual themed space for the Red Bull Illume on November 26, 2009. It is an exhibition of adventure and action sports photographs from Red Bull Illume. The winning photograph from each of the competition’s ten categories is displayed on large illuminate cubes, imitating the real-life exhibit. There is also an exit to the Red Bull Air Race space and the Red Bull Beach space which features the Red Bull Flugtag.

References

External links
 https://win.gs/3D5ns7e
 https://www.redbullcontentpool.com/redbullillume

Arts competitions
Photography exhibitions
Red Bull